Scythian Nunatak is an isolated ridge about 1 nautical mile (1.9 km) southeast of Trudge Valley in the Allan Hills, Oates Land. Reconnoitered by the New Zealand Antarctic Research Program (NZARP) Allan Hills Expedition (1964). They found the feature to be continually shrouded in drifting snow and named it after the land of the scythians which, according to the Romans, had this peculiarity in common.

Nunataks of Oates Land